Stenalia is a genus of beetles in the family Mordellidae. It contains the following species:

References

Mordellidae
Polyphaga genera
 
Taxa named by Étienne Mulsant